The first Howard ministry (Liberal–National coalition) was the 60th ministry of the Government of Australia. It was led by the country's 25th prime minister, John Howard. The first Howard ministry succeeded the second Keating ministry, which dissolved on 11 March 1996 following the federal election that took place on 2 March 1996, which saw the Coalition defeat Paul Keating's Labor Party. The ministry was replaced by the second Howard ministry on 21 October 1998 following the 1998 federal election.

Cabinet

Outer ministry

Parliamentary Secretaries

See also
 Second Howard ministry
 Third Howard ministry
 Fourth Howard ministry

Notes

Ministries of Elizabeth II
Howard, 1
1990s in Australia
1996 establishments in Australia
1998 disestablishments in Australia
Cabinets established in 1996
Cabinets disestablished in 1998
Howard Government